Białcz refers to the following places in Poland:

 Białcz, Greater Poland Voivodeship
 Białcz, Lubusz Voivodeship
 Nowy Białcz
 Stary Białcz